Tranmere is a suburb of Birkenhead, on the Wirral Peninsula, England. Administratively, it is within the Birkenhead and Tranmere Ward of the Metropolitan Borough of Wirral, in Merseyside. Before local government reorganisation on 1 April 1974, it was part of the County Borough of Birkenhead, within the geographical county of Cheshire.

At the 2001 census, the population of Tranmere was 11,668. By the 2011 census the suburb was combined with the centre of Birkenhead. The population was recorded as 15,879.

History
Its name was given by Norwegian Vikings who settled and colonised Wirral in the 10th century. Tranmere in Old Norse is Trani-melr, meaning "crane (bird) sandbank" or "sandbank with the cranes".

Until the early 19th century, Tranmere was the second most populous settlement in Wirral, with a population of 353 in 1801, centred mainly in the area of what is now Church Road and the nearby hamlet of Hinderton. By 1901, the number of residents had grown to 37,709.

Tranmere Old Hall and its estate, was situated around what is now Church Road. It was a large, gabled building constructed around 1614. 
According to the author Philip Sulley's The Hundred of Wirral (1889), in about 1860: 
... [Tranmere Old Hall] was pulled down by an ignorant boor who became possessed of it by some mischance, to make way for shops and houses.

Historically a township in the parish of Bebington in the Wirral Hundred, it became a civil parish from 1866. In 1877 Tranmere was absorbed into the County Borough of Birkenhead, Cheshire, and the civil parish was abolished in 1898. 
On creation of the county of Merseyside in 1974, Tranmere became part of the Metropolitan Borough of Wirral.

The Ingleborough Road Memorial Playing Fields were part of the now defunct Birkenhead Institute school from 1925 and opened for use the following year. The fields and pavilion were created as a memorial to the former students of the school killed in action in World War I, which included the poet Wilfred Owen. Ornamental gates were added to the site in 1933. 
The site was purchased by Tranmere Rovers Football Club in 1995. 
Despite opposition, the land was redeveloped for housing in 2012.

Ferry service
Queen Elizabeth granted John Poole the lease of ferry rights at Tranmere in 1586. The Etna, the first steam-powered ferry on the River Mersey operated from Tranmere Pool to Liverpool on 17 April 1817.  
The early part of the 19th Century were prosperous times for Tranmere's ferry service, but this was to change with the completion of Thomas Brassey's New Chester Road in 1833 and the opening of the Chester and Birkenhead Railway in 1840. Further blows to trade came with the commencement of a horse-drawn tramway in 1877 between New Ferry and Woodside Ferry and the opening of the Mersey Railway between Liverpool and nearby Green Lane railway station in 1886. By 1904, the ferry service had ceased and Tranmere Pool was enclosed as Cammell Laird Dock as part of an extension of the shipyard.

Air raid shelter
Tranmere contains one of the largest and most expensive World War II air raid shelters in the country. By the time the tunnels were completed, they were no longer needed as the threat of invasion had diminished. The tunnels were later used by the Ministry of Food for storage, and were considered as a nuclear fallout shelter during the Cold War era. The tunnels were sealed in 1989, amid growing health and safety concerns. The tunnels still exist and building work in 2008 uncovered a shaft, which allowed temporary exploration, before being sealed again.

Geography
Tranmere is situated on the eastern side of the Wirral Peninsula, at the western side of the River Mersey.

Governance
Tranmere is within the parliamentary constituency of Birkenhead. The current Member of Parliament is Mick Whitley, a Labour representative.

At local government level, the area is mostly incorporated into the Birkenhead and Tranmere Ward of the Metropolitan Borough of Wirral, in the metropolitan county of Merseyside. (A small portion to the south of Green Lane station is now part of the Rock Ferry Ward.) Representation on Wirral Metropolitan Borough Council is undertaken by three councillors. The most recent local elections took place on 6 May 2021.

Community
Tranmere is made up of industrial buildings and Victorian terraced houses, although it has seen a significant amount of property development recently. From 2005, the area was one of the 35 government neighbourhood pathfinder areas.

Education
Mersey Park Primary School serves the area.

Healthcare
St Catherine's Health Centre occupies a large site in Higher Tranmere. The original facility on the site was built as the Birkenhead Union Workhouse between 1861 and 1863 and designed by Thomas Leyland. Around 2013, the Victorian hospital buildings were replaced with a modern medical facility and community centre.

Green spaces
Two urban parks are located in Tranmere. Mersey Park to the north and Victoria Park to the south. Mersey Park hosts one of several annual Bonfire Night municipal firework displays put on by Wirral Borough Council. Victoria Park contains a community hall at the bottom of Albany Road, a cricket pitch and clubhouse. Victoria Park was originally the gardens of a large property called The Towers, built in the 1860s as a French-style chateau by Victor Poutz, a French cotton merchant.

Landmarks

At the top end of Victoria Park stands the Tranmere Cross, a cross fragment with a worn stone base, believed to be circa fifteenth century in origin. The structure is a designated Grade II listed building that was put on the present site in 1937 and which once marked the entrance to Tranmere on Church Road.

Sport
Tranmere is best known for its football club, Tranmere Rovers F.C., founded in 1884. Tranmere Rovers now plays at nearby Prenton Park, in Birkenhead itself, but has kept the Tranmere name.

Transport
Green Lane railway station is situated on the Wirral line of the Merseyrail network. Services operate northbound to Liverpool, via Birkenhead town centre and southbound to Chester and Ellesmere Port.

Notable people
First World War poet Wilfred Owen lived at three successive homes in Tranmere during the time his father was Stationmaster at Woodside from 1898 to 1907 and was pupil at the nearby now defunct Birkenhead Institute School.

Mersey Park Primary School has several famous former pupils including Jason McAteer (footballer) and Patricia Routledge (Hyacinth Bucket in the BBC TV sitcom Keeping up Appearances). Paul O'Grady, famous for his alter-ego creation Lily Savage, was raised in the area.

Colin Haygarth, the Scottish gunmaker, was born in Tranmere. He lived in Milton Road until he was four years old, when his family moved to nearby Irby. He was The Queen Mother's gunmaker from 1965 until 2002, is the oldest living gunmaker in the UK and the last to have done "war work". He made parts for Sten guns in the workshops of the gunmaker W.C. Carswell in Liverpool, and served in the Irby branch of the Home Guard.

See also
Listed buildings in Tranmere, Merseyside

References

Sources

Bibliography

External links

 Photographs of Tranmere

Towns and villages in the Metropolitan Borough of Wirral
Birkenhead